Edgar Garibay Padilla (born March 5, 1990) is a Mexican basketball player who is a member of the Mexico national basketball team, where he participated at the 2015 PanAmerican Games for men, the 2016 Centrobasket Championship in Panama, and the  2016 FIBA Olympic Qualifying Tournament in Turin, Italy.

On January 13, 2022, Garibay signed with KB Peja of the Kosovo Basketball Superleague.

References

External links
 RealGM profile
 Loyola Marymount Lions bio
 Long Beach State Beach bio

1990 births
Mexican men's basketball players
Mexican expatriate basketball people in the United States
Living people
Centers (basketball)
Loyola Marymount Lions men's basketball players
Long Beach State Beach men's basketball players
Abejas de León players
Aguacateros de Michoacán players
Fuerza Regia de Monterrey players
Pioneros de Quintana Roo players
Rayos de Hermosillo players
Venados de Mazatlán (basketball) players
Basketball players from Jalisco
People from Ocotlán, Jalisco
Basketball players from Compton, California